Union Church and Burial Ground (also known as the Old Mud Church) is a historic church and cemetery on E. Presqueisle Street in Philipsburg, Pennsylvania.

A log meetinghouse was built in 1820 by the 57 residents of Philipsburg for a cost of $343.  The building was used both as a school and as the community's first church, open to all Protestant ministers.

In 1842 the building was extensively rebuilt as a Gothic style Anglican church with a three-story entrance tower added to the front, a chancel added to the rear and the log walls of the meetinghouse incorporated into the main sanctuary. A rough mixture of plaster and clay stucco covers the church giving it its common name of the "Old Mud Church."

Hardman Philips had donated much of the money to rebuild the church and intended to make it an Episcopalian Church.  After a lengthy lawsuit, the church continued to serve many denominations including Episcopalians, Presbyterians, and Methodists.  The last regular religious use was by Free Methodists in the early 1920s. The building has also been used as a local museum.

The cemetery is surrounded by a three-foot stone wall and contains a 330-year-old white oak known as the "Founder's Oak."  The oldest grave is dated 1819.

The church and cemetery were added to the National Register of Historic Places in 1978.  It is located in the Philipsburg Historic District.

References

External links

Historic American Buildings Survey, 3 photos, 7 drawings and 2 data pages
"Old Mud Church", 3 interior photographs
Find a grave

Churches on the National Register of Historic Places in Pennsylvania
Gothic Revival church buildings in Pennsylvania
Churches completed in 1820
Churches in Centre County, Pennsylvania
National Register of Historic Places in Centre County, Pennsylvania